Crown Princess may refer to one of the following ships:

 , 1990-built cruise ship in service with Princess Cruises until 2002
 , 2006-built cruise ship in service with Princess Cruise Line since 2006

Ship names